Dalal is an Arabic name which means: fondness, passion, penchant, predilection, liking, partiality. It is used as a female given name in the Arab world. The Arabic name has also been adopted as a surname in the Indian subcontinent; while mainly used among Indian Muslims and other South Asian Muslims, it is also used among non-Muslim Indians.

Given name
Dalal Abdel Aziz (1960–2021), Egyptian actress.
Dalal Achcar (born 1937), Brazilian choreographer
Dalal Al-Bizri, Lebanese researcher
Dalal Bruchmann (born 1988), Austrian musician and actress
Dalal bint Mukhled Al-Harbi, member of the Saudi Shura Council
Dalal Mesfer Al-Harith (born 1999), Qatari sprinter
Dalal Khalifa, Qatari novelist and playwright
Dalal Khario, Yazidi refugee and author
Dalal Midhat-Talakić (born 1981), Bosnian singer
Dalal Mughrabi (1959–1978), Palestinian militant
Dalal Salameh (born 1965), Palestinian activist and politician
Dalal bint Saud Al Saud (1957–2021), Saudi royal

Surname
Anila Dalal, Gujarati critic and translator
Dadiba Merwanji Dalal, Indian diplomat
Dinanath Dalal, Indian painter
Hiten Dalal, Indian cricketer
Hussain Dalal, actor and writer
Jai Parkash Dalal, Indian politician
Karamjyoti Dalal, Indian para-athlete
Karan Singh Dalal, Indian politician
Kavita Dalal, Indian wrestler under the name Kavita Devi
Jayanti Dalal, Indian author and politician
Maneck Dalal, Indian aviation manager
Naresh Dalal, physical chemist
Rahul Dalal, Indian cricketer
Roshen Dalal, Indian writer
Sucheta Dalal, Indian journalist 
Suresh Dalal, Gujarati writer
Tarla Dalal, Indian food writer
Yair Dalal, Israeli musician
Yamini Dalal, Indian biochemist
Yogen K Dalal, Indian engineer and Internet pioneer

See also

References

Arabic feminine given names